Garfield is a former rural locality in the Barcaldine Region, Queensland, Australia.

On 22 November 2019 the Queensland Government decided to amalgamate the localities in the Barcaldine Region, resulting in five expanded localities based on the larger towns: Alpha, Aramac, Barcaldine, Jericho and Muttaburra. Garfield was mostly incorporated into Jericho, except for the western corner which was incorporated into Aramac.

Geography 
The Capricorn Highway and, immediately south, the Central Western railway line form the southern boundary of the locality.

The Great Dividing Range passes through the north-east of the locality.

The Alice River flows through the locality entering from the north-east (Dunrobin) and exiting to the south-west (Grant). It is part of the Lake Eyre drainage basin.

The principal land use in grazing on native vegetation.

History 
The town and the parish take their name from a pastoral run named by Thomas Behan in 1886 after the American President James Abram Garfield.

Education 
There are no schools in Garfield. The nearest primary school is in neighbouring Jericho and the nearest secondary schools are in Alpha (to Year 10 only) and Barcaldine (to Year 12). However, due to travelling times, boarding schools and distance education are other options.

References 

Barcaldine Region
Unbounded localities in Queensland